Datafication is a technological trend turning many aspects of our life into data which is subsequently transferred into information realised as a new form of value. Kenneth Cukier and Viktor Mayer-Schönberger introduced the term datafication to the broader lexicon in 2013. Up until this time, datafication had been associated with the analysis of representations of our lives captured through data, but not on the present scale. This change was primarily due to the impact of big data and the computational opportunities afforded to predictive analytics.  Datafication is not the same as digitization, which takes analog content—books, films, photographs—and converts it into digital information, a sequence of ones and zeros that computers can read. Datafication is a far broader activity: taking all aspects of life and turning them into data [...] Once we datafy things, we can transform their purpose and turn the information into new forms of value There is an ideological aspect of datafication, called dataism: "the drive towards datafication is rooted in a belief in the capacity of data to represent social life, sometimes better or more objectively than pre-digital (human) interpretations.”

Examples 
Examples of datafication as applied to social and communication media are how Twitter datafies stray thoughts or datafication of HR by LinkedIn and others.  Alternative examples are diverse and include aspects of the built environment, and design via engineering and or other tools that tie data to formal, functional or other physical media outcomes. Data collection and -processing for optimal control (e.g. shape optimization) is an example.

Impact 

Human resources Data obtained from mobile phones, apps or social media usage is used to identify potential employees and their specific characteristics such as risk taking profile and personality. This data will replace personality tests. Rather using the traditional personality tests or the exams that measure the analytical thinking, using the data obtained through datafication will change existing exam providers. Also, with this data new personality measures will be developed.
Insurance and Banking Data is used to understand an individual's risk profile and likelihood to pay a loan.
Customer relationship managementVarious industries are using datafication to understand their customers better and create appropriate triggers based on each customer's personality and behaviour. This data is obtained from the language and tone a person uses in emails, phone calls or social medias.

Smart cityThrough the data obtained from the sensors that are implemented into the smart city, issues that can arise might be noticed and tackled in areas such as transportation, waste management, logistics, and energy. On the basis of real-time data, commuters could change their routes when there is a traffic jam. With the sensors that can measure air and water quality, cities can not only gain a more detailed understanding of the pollution levels, but may also enact new environmental regulations based on real-time data.

See also
 Digital citizen
 Data science
 Digitization/ Digitalization
 Digital transformation
 Big data
 Ethics of artificial intelligence
 Big data ethics
 Machine learning
 Mass surveillance
 Surveillance capitalism

References

External links
 

Information science
Technology forecasting
Data management
Big data
Information society